The Lie Tree is the seventh children's fantasy novel by Frances Hardinge, published in 2015 by Macmillan Publishers. The book won the 2015 Costa Book of the Year.

Synopsis 
The Lie Tree is set in the male-dominated Victorian scientific society, and tells the story of Faith Sunderly, a 14-year-old girl whose father is killed under mysterious circumstances after the family moves to a small island to get away from London. In her efforts to discover what happened to her father, and to follow his footsteps of studying natural science, she discovers a tree that provides truths by feeding on whispered lies.  The lies and rumors that Faith starts grow rapidly and events soon become out of control.

Reception 
The Guardian praised The Lie Tree's "convincing picture of the times" and Hardinge's "trademark wit and intelligence", calling the book "at once entertaining and provocative". The Sunday Times named the book its children's book of the year for 2015.

In the 2015 Costa Book Awards, The Lie Tree won both in the Children's Book Award category and the overall Book of the Year, an achievement only previously managed by Philip Pullman's The Amber Spyglass in 2001. The judges for the Children's Book Award "loved [the] dark, sprawling, fiercely clever novel", stating it would "grip readers of all ages", while the chair of the judges for the Book of the Year award described the book as a "real page turner", suitable for adults as much as for children.

References

External links 

 The Lie Tree on Frances Hardinge's website
 The Lie Tree on Macmillan's website

2015 British novels
British fantasy novels
Children's fantasy novels
Costa Book Award-winning works
British children's novels
2015 children's books
Novels set in Victorian England
Macmillan Publishers books
Novels set on islands